This is a list of Turkish television related events from 2016.

Events
2 February - Emre Sertkaya wins the fifth season of O Ses Türkiye.
6 March - The first season of Big Brother Türkiye is won by Sinan Aydemir.

Debuts

Television shows

2010s
O Ses Türkiye (2011–present)
Big Brother Türkiye (2015–present)

Ending this year

Births

Deaths

See also
2016 in Turkey

References